The radial notch of the ulna (lesser sigmoid cavity) is a narrow, oblong, articular depression on the lateral side of the coronoid process; it receives the circumferential articular surface of the head of the radius.

It is concave from before backward, and its prominent extremities serve for the attachment of the annular ligament.

Additional images

References

External links
 
  elbow/elbowbones/bones3 at the Dartmouth Medical School's Department of Anatomy

Upper limb anatomy
Ulna